In Motion: The Remixes is the first official remix album by CCM recording artist Amy Grant. The album was released on August 19, 2014, by Capitol CMG and Sparrow Records. It contains dance remixes of seven best known songs from Grant, plus two remixes of "Stay for Awhile", a bonus track radio edit remix of "Out in the Open" and a medley mega mix all done by various DJs and engineers. "Baby Baby (2014)" featuring Dave Audé was released as the first single and reached number 3 on the Billboard Dance Club Songs chart. Grant's first appearance on the dance chart was the "Baby Baby" remixes during the Heart in Motion period 23 years ago, peaking at number 23. With the exceptions of "Out in the Open" and the "Mega Mix", each song has their own remix EPs that were released the following month. The album debuted and peaked at number 110 on the Top 200 Albums chart, number 8 on the Top Christian Albums chart, and number 5 on the Top Dance/Electronic Albums chart.

Track listing
Tracks for the Digital Edition

Critical reception
Matt Collar of AllMusic said the remix album "showcases remixed versions of many of the contemporary Christian pop vocalist's best-loved songs" and "are high-energy cuts that retain all of Grant's bright, passionate pop style, and they're perfectly suited for any club- or dance-oriented situation."

At Cross Rhythms, Joy Attmore says that In Motion... has "a seamless flow and steady pace of energy between each track which make this a very enjoyable listen, hard to sit still to or refrain from singing along to. For a generation that may not be as well versed in Grant's discography, today's recording technology has brought a new sheen to some of Nashville's most memorable CCM. So expect to hear cuts from this set even in the lands of glow stick-waving and raving beats."

Mark D. Geil of Jesus Freak Hideaway has a different opinion about In Motion... he says that the album's worst moments, the lyrics and the music become a complete mismatch. There are two (yes, two) remixes of "Stay for Awhile," a sweet song about catching up with an old friend better suited for a lazy summer day than a club. "Say Once More" somehow strips the earnestness from Grant's vocal. And "Better than a Hallelujah" might be a leader among songs most ill-suited for a remix.

Charts

References

2014 remix albums
Remix albums by American artists
Amy Grant compilation albums
Sparrow Records remix albums
Capitol Records remix albums